William Lewis Sharkey (July 12, 1798 – March 30, 1873) was an American judge and politician from Mississippi. A staunch Unionist during the American Civil War, he opposed the 1861 declared secession of Mississippi from the United States. After the end of the war, President Andrew Johnson appointed Sharkey as provisional governor of Mississippi in 1865.

Biography

Early life
William Lewis Sharkey was born on July 12, 1798, in Sumner County, Tennessee. When he was six, he moved to Warren County, Mississippi in 1804 with his family. In 1822, he was admitted to the bar in Natchez, Mississippi.

Career
In 1825, he moved to Vicksburg. He was later elected for a single term in the Mississippi House of Representatives, where he served from 1828 to 1829. He then served briefly in 1832 as a circuit court judge before being elected to the High Court of Errors and Appeals of Mississippi (today the Supreme Court of Mississippi), where he sat as a justice for 18 years until his resignation in 1851. Sharkey subsequently was appointed Secretary of War by then-President Millard Fillmore; however, he declined the position. From 1851 to 1854, he served as United States consul in Havana, Cuba.

He was a member of the Whig Party and was vehemently opposed to the secession of Mississippi in 1861. Throughout the Civil War, he remained a staunch Unionist and, according to one source, was "tolerated by his Confederate neighbors only because of his towering reputation as a jurist."

Governor Charles Clark appointed him in 1865 as a commissioner (along with William Yerger) to confer on behalf of the state with President Andrew Johnson. On June 13, 1865, Johnson appointed Sharkey the state's provisional governor. Sharkey left office with the election of Benjamin G. Humphreys in October. He was elected Senator in 1865 but was denied his seat by Congress.

Death
Sharkey died in Washington, D.C., in 1873. He is interred in Greenwood Cemetery in Jackson, Mississippi.

Legacy
Sharkey County, Mississippi, located in the Mississippi Delta region, is named in his honor.

See also
Hinds v. Brazealle
List of justices of the Supreme Court of Mississippi

References

External links

 

1798 births
1873 deaths
19th-century American politicians
American consuls
Governors of Mississippi
Members of the Mississippi House of Representatives
Justices of the Mississippi Supreme Court
Mississippi Whigs
People from Sumner County, Tennessee
People from Warren County, Mississippi
Southern Unionists in the American Civil War
19th-century American judges